Lake Yojoa is the largest lake in Honduras with a surface area of  and an average depth of . The Lake Yojoa volcanic field consists of Pleistocene to Holocene scoria cones, craters, and lava flows.

The west side of the lake is bordered by steep mountains and Santa Bárbara National Park while the east side is adjacent to Cerro Azul Meambar National Park. The lake is situated on the highway that connects the two largest Honduran cities, Tegucigalpa and San Pedro Sula. For many people traveling between the cities, the lake serves as a rest area where they can appreciate the view and enjoy the fresh fried fish and other foods that are offered by the restaurants located on its banks.

Lake Yojoa is a popular fishing destination and the surrounding area has a rich biodiversity—almost 400 species of birds and 800 plant species have been identified in the region. However, it also is threatened by deforestation, cattle ranching, and development. The settlers of the communities around the lake are dedicated to the cultivation of fruits, vegetables and basic grains. Nevertheless, many of these inhabitants earn their living from the sale of fish originating from the lake.

People dedicate surrounding areas to the growing of coffee plants. Coffee grown near Lake Yojoa, in Santa Barbara, is particularly well-known.

See also
 List of volcanoes in Honduras

References

 
 Lake Yojoa, Birds of Honduras
 Lake Yojoa, Interactive Maps

Lakes of Honduras
Volcanoes of Honduras
Ramsar sites in Honduras